Mónica Álvarez de Mon Olabarri (born 19 December 1955) is a Spanish former professional tennis player who won two medals at the 1979 Mediterranean Games.

From 1977 to 1980, she appeared in 9 Federation Cup ties for Spain. Together with Carmen Perea and Vicky Baldovinos, Álvarez de Mon became in 1979 one of the first three Spanish female tennis players to compete in Australia.

See also
List of Spain Fed Cup team representatives

References

External links
 
 

1955 births
Living people
Spanish female tennis players
Mediterranean Games silver medalists for Spain
Mediterranean Games bronze medalists for Spain
Mediterranean Games medalists in tennis
Competitors at the 1979 Mediterranean Games
20th-century Spanish women